Marissa Ribisi (born December 17, 1974) is an American actress who performed in the films Dazed and Confused, True Crime, The Brady Bunch Movie, Pleasantville, and Don's Plum and television shows such as Felicity, Friends, Grace Under Fire, Watching Ellie, and Tales of the City. She is the twin sister of actor Giovanni Ribisi.

Early life
Ribisi began acting when she was nine years old. Her twin brother, Giovanni, is also an actor. Like her brother, she is a Scientologist.

Career
Ribisi first appeared on television in 1988, playing a minor red-haired character,  possibly because she's a natural redhead, named Ginger in "She'll Get Over It", an episode of My Two Dads. This was followed by similar brief appearances in Baywatch ("Old Friends" 1990), DEA (1991), and the miniseries Tales of the City (1993), playing a receptionist.

Ribisi's first role in a feature film was in the 1993 film Dazed and Confused. She starred alongside Matthew McConaughey and Adam Goldberg, who were then, like Ribisi, unknowns. The actress played Cynthia, a socially marginalized girl who runs with two verbose outsiders (Goldberg and Anthony Rapp).

In 1998, Ribisi cowrote the film Some Girl and starred in it alongside Juliette Lewis, Michael Rapaport, and Giovanni Ribisi. The film, directed by Rory Kelly, relates the story of insecure young women searching for long-term relationships in 1990s Los Angeles. She has had roles in the films True Crime, The Brady Bunch Movie, Pleasantville, and Don's Plum. She has also appeared in television shows such as Felicity, Friends, Grace Under Fire, and Watching Ellie, as well as the TV miniseries Tales of the City.

She also appeared on the short-lived TV series Grown Ups from 1999 to 2000. In 2001 she played the role of Dora in the movie 100 Girls. In October 2007, Ribisi launched a fashion line, Whitley Kros, with partner Sophia Banks.

Personal life
Ribisi married musician and recording artist Beck in April 2004, shortly before giving birth to their son, Cosimo Henri. The couple's second child, daughter Tuesday, was born in 2007. On February 15, 2019, Beck filed for divorce from Ribisi after nearly 15 years of marriage. Their divorce was finalized on September 3, 2021.

References

External links
 

1974 births
Living people
American child actresses
American film actresses
American television actresses
20th-century American actresses
21st-century American actresses
Fraternal twin actresses
American Scientologists
Actresses from Los Angeles
American people of Italian descent
American twins
Beck